HeartCatch PreCure! is the seventh Pretty Cure anime television series produced by Toei Animation. It follows four teenage girls who become Pretty Cure in order to stop the evil Desert Apostles before they destroy the Great Tree of Hearts and turn the world into a desert.

The series aired in Japan from February 7, 2010 to January 30, 2011, replacing Fresh Pretty Cure! in its initial timeslot and was succeeded by Suite PreCure.

The series uses three pieces of theme music, one opening and two ending themes.


Episode list

See also
HeartCatch PreCure! the Movie: Fashion Show in the Flower Capital... Really?! - An animated film based on the series.
Pretty Cure All Stars DX2: Light of Hope☆Protect the Rainbow Jewel! - The second film in the Pretty Cure All Stars crossover series, starring the HeartCatch Pretty Cures.

References

2010 Japanese television seasons
2011 Japanese television seasons
HeartCatch PreCure!

es:Anexo:Episodios de Futari wa Pretty Cure